The Turkish Women's Third Football League is the fourth-level league competition for women's association football in Turkey.

History
The Women's Third League was established in 2014 launching its first season in the 2014–15. It replaced the Turkish Women's Regional Football League, which existed two seasons in 2009–10 and 2010–11.

Format
As of the 2021–22 season, 85 teams compete for promoting to the Women's Second League. They are divided into 16 groups according to their geographical location. In each group, teams play against each other home-and-away in a round-robin format and play-off rounds. 8 Teams from play-off rounds will promote to Women's Second League.

Teams promoted to Women's Second League

See also
 Women's football in Turkey
 Turkish Women's Football Super League
 Turkish Women's Football First League
 Turkish Women's Second Football League
 Turkish Women's Regional Football League
List of women's football clubs in Turkey
Turkish women in sports

External links

 Official Site  of the Turkish Football Federation

Sports leagues established in 2014
Third
Football
Fourth level football leagues in Europe
Professional sports leagues in Turkey